KNBT (92.1 FM) is a radio station broadcasting an Americana music format. Licensed to New Braunfels, Texas, United States, the station serves the San Antonio area.  The station is the longtime home of the New Braunfels Unicorns football team. The station is currently owned by New Braunfels Communications, Inc.

References

External links

NBT
Americana radio stations